Ruberlysin (Crotalus ruber metalloendopeptidase II, hemorrhagic toxin II) is an enzyme. This enzyme catalyses the following chemical reaction

 Cleavage of His10-Leu, Ala14-Leu, Tyr16-Leu and Gly23-Phe bonds in the B chain of insulin; His-Pro, Pro-Phe, and Trp-Ser of angiotensin I; and Gly-Phe of Met enkephalin

This endopeptidase is present in the venom of the red rattlesnake (Crotalus ruber ruber).

References

External links 
 

EC 3.4.24